Bromley Rock Provincial Park is a provincial park in British Columbia, Canada.  Bromley Rock is a popular swimming, canoeing and cliff jumping destination located on the Similkameen River, approximately fifteen minutes from Princeton.

History 
Bromley Rock Provincial Park was established on March 16, 1956. Bromley Rock is a traditional First nations fishing site.

References 

Provincial parks of British Columbia
Similkameen Country
1956 establishments in British Columbia